Credit Europe Bank (CEB) is a Dutch-registered bank owned by the Turkish financial holding company FIBA Group.  The bank is focused on corporate lending as well as on retail banking and operates in the eurozone countries of the Netherlands, Germany, Malta as well as in Romania, Switzerland and Ukraine. The bank's strategy is to offer easy-to-use retail banking and SME products, as well as private banking. It also offers trade finance and corporate banking services.

Originally founded as Finansbank it was renamed to Credit Europe Bank in 2007 when that bank was sold to a Greek bank and the foreign units split into a new bank with headquarters in Amsterdam.

History
The banking group was first known as Finansbank (Holland) N.V. and was incorporated on 24 February 1994. The bank has had a full banking license in The Netherlands since 1994 and is supervised by the Dutch Central Bank, De Nederlandsche Bank.

In 2007 the bank was rebranded as Credit Europe Bank N.V., after Finansbank (the Turkish branch of Finansbank and the 5th biggest bank of Turkey) was sold to the National Bank of Greece. The brand 'Finansbank' was also included in the deal, leading to all branches (except the Turkish one) were renamed into Credit Europe Bank.

Operations

Corporate banking
Credit Europe Bank offers corporate banking services and products such as working capital and project finance loans, syndicated loans and factoring services. In addition, CEB has valuable experience in structured trade and commodity finance.

Bank Relations
The Credit Europe Bank relations team focuses on risk analysis, global trade services (clearing) and forfaiting.  Bank Relations furthermore works closely with Corporate Banking and Treasury to facilitate their activities. Bank Relations maintains correspondent relationships with more than 300 banks worldwide. The aim is to stimulate trade finance opportunities, primarily in the bank's target markets. Knowledge exchange and cross-fertilization with subsidiaries contributed to overall performance.

Retail banking
The bank offers individuals and SME clients straight forward retail banking products in four European countries: the Netherlands, Germany, Malta and Romania.

Corporate Governance
Although Credit Europe Bank NV is not listed in the Netherlands, it voluntarily adheres to the principles and best practices of the Dutch Corporate Governance Code, also known as the “Code Tabaksblat”. Additionally, as banking organization, Credit Europe Bank NV also underwrites the Basel Committee rules on Enhancing Corporate Governance for Banking Organisations (the “Basel Rules”).

Credit Europe Bank NV applies a two tier board structure with a Supervisory Board and Managing Board.

The Supervisory Board of Credit Europe Bank NV consists of 5 members, as at 2022 these are; Hector de Beaufort (chairman), Ayşecan Özyeğin Oktay, Willem Frederik (Wilfred) Nagel, Korkmaz Ilkorur and Seha Ismen Ozgur.

The members and respective functions of the managing board of Credit Europe Bank NV are; Şenol Aloğlu (CEO), Umut Bayoğlu and Batuhan Yalnız

References
 http://www.bankeneffectenbedrijf.nl/B-E/Archief/2009/Mei-2009/Interview-TC-Beriker.aspx 
 http://www.di-ve.com/Default.aspx?ID=49&Action=1&NewsId=71465
 http://www.timesofmalta.com/business/view/20100304/news/credit-europe-bank-launches-new-corporate-website
 https://web.archive.org/web/20110722222230/http://www.maltabusinessweekly.com.mt//news.asp?newsitemid=8402
 https://web.archive.org/web/20120301153020/http://www.independent.com.mt/news.asp?newsitemid=101913

External links

https://www.crediteuropebank.com/about-us/corporate-governance/two-tier-structure/
 Credit Europe Bank NV Annual Report 2018
 Credit Europe Bank (in English)

Banks established in 1994
Banks based in Amsterdam
Turkish companies established in 1994